Off the ball (or OTB) is a term used in football in the United Kingdom, usually associated with a player's action when not in possession of the ball, such as a fight or a late challenge.

If a referee does not see an OTB incident, his assistant referee or linesman may draw his attention, usually activating a buzzer that the referee has strapped to his upper arm. The linesman will inform the referee as to what happened and the referee will act accordingly to the laws of the game. This may involve sending the involved player off or otherwise booking him.

External links 

 Tottenham 4-1 Bolton, BBC Sport, 25 February, 2007.
 Clockwatch: China 0-2 Costa Rica, BBC Sport, 4 June, 2002.

Terminology used in multiple sports
Association football terminology
Association football skills
Basketball terminology
Rugby league terminology
Rugby union terminology